The maiden edition of the Nollywood Movies Awards was held at the Civic Center in Lagos Nigeria on 2 June 2012 to reward excellence of film professionals in Nollywood. Tango with Me and Mirror Boy won the most awards. Genevieve Nnaji and Ramsey Nouah won the viewer's choice awards for the female and male categories respectively by popular vote.

Winners

Awards

Winners are written first and are emboldened.

References

Entertainment events in Nigeria
2012 film awards
Nigerian film awards